UFC on ESPN: dos Anjos vs. Edwards (also known as UFC on ESPN 4) was a mixed martial arts event produced by the Ultimate Fighting Championship that took place on July 20, 2019 at the AT&T Center in San Antonio, Texas.

Background
The event marked the promotion's second visit to San Antonio and first since UFC Fight Night: Swanson vs. Stephens in June 2014.

A welterweight bout between former UFC Lightweight Champion Rafael dos Anjos and Leon Edwards was the event headliner.

Alexey Oleynik was expected to face Walt Harris on May 4, 2019 at UFC Fight Night: Iaquinta vs. Cowboy. However, Oleinik was pulled from the pairing with Harris on April 3 and instead faced Alistair Overeem at UFC Fight Night: Overeem vs. Oleinik after former Bellator Heavyweight Champion Alexander Volkov had to withdraw. The pairing was rescheduled for this event.

A lightweight bout between Alexander Hernandez and Francisco Trinaldo has also been rescheduled for the event. The pairing was first expected to take place on January 26, 2019 at UFC 233. However, Hernandez was pulled from that fight in favor of a bout with former lightweight title challenger Donald Cerrone a week earlier at UFC Fight Night: Cejudo vs. Dillashaw.

A women's flyweight bout between former UFC Women's Bantamweight Championship challenger Liz Carmouche and former UFC Women's Flyweight Championship challenger Roxanne Modafferi was scheduled for the event. However, Carmouche was pulled from that bout in favor of a rematch with current champion Valentina Shevchenko in August at UFC Fight Night: Shevchenko vs. Carmouche. Modafferi is now expected to face former Invicta FC Flyweight Champion Jennifer Maia in a rematch of their 2016 bout, which Maia won via split decision to defend the title. At the weigh-ins, Maia weighed in at 129 pounds, 3 pounds over the women's flyweight non-title fight limit of 126. As a result Maia was fined 30 percent of her purse, and the bout proceeded as scheduled at a catchweight.

Results

Bonus awards
The following fighters received $50,000 bonuses.
Fight of the Night: Mario Bautista vs. Jin Soo Son 
Performance of the Night: Walt Harris and Dan Hooker

Records set
With a total of ten (10) decisions on the card, the event tied UFC 169, UFC Fight Night: Machida vs. Mousasi, UFC Fight Night: Silva vs. Bisping, UFC Fight Night: Whittaker vs. Brunson, and UFC Fight Night: Werdum vs. Tybura for the most decisions at a single UFC event.

Nine consecutive decisions was also a new UFC single-event record.

See also 

 List of UFC events
 2019 in UFC
 List of current UFC fighters

References 

UFC on ESPN
2019 in mixed martial arts
Mixed martial arts in Texas
Sports competitions in San Antonio
Events in San Antonio